Leonard Wilford Hardy (December 31, 1805 – July 31, 1884) was an early convert in the Latter Day Saint movement, a Mormon pioneer and a member of the presiding bishopric of the Church of Jesus Christ of Latter-day Saints (LDS Church) from 1856 until his death.

Hardy was born in Bradford, Massachusetts. On December 2, 1832, he joined the Church of Jesus Christ of Latter Day Saints, being baptized by missionary Orson Hyde.

In December 1844, Hardy traveled to England as a church missionary with Wilford Woodruff, Dan Jones, and Hiram Clark. Hardy was stationed in Preston, Lancashire, and was made the conference president in March 1845.

After returning to the United States, Hardy and his family emigrated to Utah Territory with other Mormon pioneers in 1850. Hardy contracted cholera but survived.

In Utah, Hardy was made a bishop of two different wards. On October 12, 1856, Hardy was called to be the first counselor to the church's Presiding Bishop, Edward Hunter. When Hunter died in 1883, William B. Preston became the new presiding bishop and Hardy was again selected as the first counselor. However, after just a few months working under Preston, Hardy died in Salt Lake City and was buried at Salt Lake City Cemetery.

Hardy practiced plural marriage and was the father of 18 children. Among his five wives were three sisters, Sophia Lois, Esther Smylinda, and Harriet Ann Goodridge (name also shown as Goodrich in some sources). His other two wives were Elizabeth Harriman Nichols and Rachel Smith Gardner.

Leonard Wilford Hardy is the namesake of the community of Wilford, Idaho.

Notes

References
Andrew Jenson, Latter-day Saint Biographical Encyclopedia, vol.1, 236–37
Deseret Morning News Church Almanac 2007

External links
Grampa Bill's G.A. Pages: Leonard W. Hardy

|-
|width="30%" align="center" |Position VacantApril 6, 1847 – September 23, 1850Preceded by:George Milleras Second Bishop of the Church

1805 births
1884 deaths
19th-century Mormon missionaries
American Mormon missionaries in England
American general authorities (LDS Church)
Burials at Salt Lake City Cemetery
Converts to Mormonism
Counselors in the Presiding Bishopric (LDS Church)
Latter Day Saints from Massachusetts
Latter Day Saints from Utah
Mormon pioneers
People from Bradford, Massachusetts
Religious leaders from Massachusetts